is a Japanese actor and voice actor, who is managed by talent agency Aoni Production. He was born in Osaka, Osaka Prefecture.

Filmography

Television animation
1960s
Gigantor (1963) – Gavan
Kamui the Ninja (1969) – Sukumi
1970s
Andersen Stories – King Neptune
Space Battleship Yamato (1974) – Goer
La Seine no Hoshi (1975) – Louis XVI
1980s
The Super Dimension Fortress Macross (1982) – Admiral Takashi Hayase
Dragon Ball (1987) – Grandpa Son Gohan
Little Women (1987) – Frederick March (Father)
The Wonderful Wizard of Oz (1987) – Nome King (eps. 45-52)
Patlabor (1989) – Seitaro Sakaki
1990s
Anime Himitsu no Hanazono (1991) – Clevin/Craven
Sailor Moon (1992) – Sakiko's Father (ep. 20), Old Man Owner (ep. 71), Edwards (ep. 108)
In the Beginning: The Bible Stories (1997) – Aaron
Ehrgeiz (1997) – Balzak
Cardcaptor Sakura (1998) – Masaki Amamiya (Sakura's great-grandfather)
The Big O – Sven Marisky (ep. 3)
2000s
Chance Pop Session (2001) – Sho Kaibara
Ghost in the Shell: Stand Alone Complex (2002–05) – Daisuke Aramaki
One Piece (2002) Zenny (eps. 136-138)
Monster (2004) – BKA Chief (ep. 14)
Black Jack (2006) – Dr. Jotaro Honma
Skull Man (2007) – Gōzō Kuroshio
Golgo 13 (2008) – Captain (ep. 15)
2010s
Blade (2011) – Noah van Helsing
Sword Art Online (2013) – Leviathan
Knights of Sidonia (2014) – Shinsuke Tanba
Marvel Disk Wars: The Avengers (2014) – Charles Xavier / Professor X
Tokyo ESP (2014) – Prime Minister (ep. 11)
Pandora in the Crimson Shell: Ghost Urn (2016) – Poseidon (ep. 12)

Original net animation (ONA)
Ghost in the Shell: SAC 2045 (2020) – Daisuke Aramaki

Original video animation (OVA)
Legend of the Galactic Heroes (1988) – Kaiser Friedrich IV
Ariel (1989) – Dr. Kishida
Record of Lodoss War (1990) – King Fahn
Mobile Suit Gundam 0083: Stardust Memory (1991) – Marneri
3×3 Eyes (1991-1992) – Professor Fujii
The Silent Service (1995) – Toshio Takegami
Fire Emblem (1996) – Vector
Ninja Resurrection (1998) – Miyamoto Musashi
Ghost in the Shell: Stand Alone Complex - The Laughing Man (2005) – Daisuke Aramaki
Ghost in the Shell: S.A.C. 2nd GIG – Individual Eleven (2006) – Daisuke Aramaki
Hellsing Ultimate 1 (2006) – Father Rinaldo
My-Otome 0~S.ifr~ (2008) – John Smith

Theatrical animation
The Castle of Cagliostro (1979) – British Delegate
Patlabor: The Movie (1989) – Seitaro Sakaki
Doraemon: Nobita's Dorabian Nights (1991) – Shinto Paddo
Porco Rosso (1992) – Sky Bandit
Ninja Scroll (1993) – Toyotomi Envoy
Patlabor 2: The Movie (1993) – Seitaro Sakaki
Memories (1995) – Kamata
Slayers The Motion Picture (1995) – Rowdy Gabriev
Doraemon: Nobita's Great Adventure in the South Seas (1998) – Captain Colt
Doraemon: Nobita in the Wan-Nyan Spacetime Odyssey (2004) – Ichi/Hachi (old)
Steamboy (2004) – The Admiral

Tokusatsu
 The Return of Ultraman (1971) Alien Baltan Jr. (ep. 41), Alien Stora (ep. 42), Alien Bat (ep. 51) 
 Kamen Rider (1971) Bearconger (ep. 46)
 Mirrorman (1971) Invader of Ep. 48
 Kamen Rider vs. Shocker (1972) Rebirth Mograng, Rebirth Monsters
 Ultraman Ace (1972) Zoffy of Ep. 5/35, Undergroundmon (ep. 29), Ultraseven of Ep. 31
 Henshin Ninja Arashi (1972) Franken (ep. 21 & 24)
 Fireman (1973) Planet Metlor Telecommunications equipment
 Henshin! Ponpoko Dama (1973) PekePeke
 Kure Kure Takora (1973) Narration, Debura, Biragon, The Sea Cucumber Gang
 Kamen Rider X (1974) The G.O.D. Secret Organization (eps. 1 - 21)
 Kamen Rider Amazon (1974) Ruler of Garanda Empire (Real Great Emperor Zero) (eps. 23 & 24)
 Choujin Bibyun (1976) Matsubo (ep. 9)
 Space Ironman Kyodain (1976) Robon Foot 1 (ep. 18 & 19)
 The War in Space (1977) Dr. Schmitt (Actor : William Ross)

Video games

Dubbing roles

Live-action
John Cleese
A Fish Called Wanda – Archie Leach
Fierce Creatures – Rollo Lee
The Out-of-Towners – Mr. Mersault
The Pink Panther 2 – Chief Inspector Charles Dreyfus
Anthony Hopkins
Juggernaut – Superintendent John McLeod
Freejack – Ian McCandless
Hearts in Atlantis – Ted Brautigan
Richard Crenna
First Blood (1993 Fuji TV edition) – Colonel Sam Trautman
Rambo: First Blood Part II (1993 Fuji TV edition) – Colonel Samuel Trautman
Hot Shots! Part Deux – Colonel Denton Walters
12 Angry Men (1974 NTV edition) – Juror #5 (Jack Klugman)
Above the Law (1993 TV Asahi edition) – Kurt Zagon (Henry Silva)
Addams Family Values – Gomez Addams (Raul Julia)
Along Came a Spider – Alex Cross (Morgan Freeman)
Amadeus – Baron van Swieten (Jonathan Moore)
The American President – Senator Bob Rumson (Richard Dreyfuss)
Asteroid (1997 TV Asahi edition) – Dr. Charles Napier (Anthony Zerbe)
Batman – Carl Grissom (Jack Palance)
Batman Begins (2008 Fuji TV edition) – Lucius Fox (Morgan Freeman)
The Bodyguard – Bill Devaney (Bill Cobbs)
Broken Arrow – Pritchett (Bob Gunton)
City of Angels – Nathaniel Messinger (Dennis Franz)
Commando (1989 TV Asashi edition) – Gen. Franklin Kirby (James Olson)
Darkness – Albert Rua (Giancarlo Giannini)
Die Hard (1990 TV Asashi edition) – Joseph Yoshinobu Takagi (James Shigeta)
Dr. Quinn, Medicine Woman – Loren Bray (Orson Bean)
Dynasty – Blake Carrington (John Forsythe)
EDtv – Al (Martin Landau)
Erin Brockovich – Edward L. Masry (Albert Finney)
The Fifth Element (1999 NTV edition) – General Munro (Brion James)
Holy Man – John McBainbridge (Robert Loggia)
Home Alone (1998 TV Asashi edition) – Marley (Roberts Blossom)
Inside Man – Arthur Case (Christopher Plummer)
Intersection – Neal (Martin Landau)
JFK (1994 TV Asashi edition) – Jack Martin (Jack Lemmon)
Judge Dredd – Chief Justice Fargo (Max von Sydow)
Miami Rhapsody – Vic Marcus (Paul Mazursky)
Midnight in the Garden of Good and Evil – Sonny Seiler (Jack Thompson)
Miller's Crossing – Leo O'Bannon (Albert Finney)
Mimic – Manny (Giancarlo Giannini)
Miss Congeniality – Stan Fields (William Shatner)
Miss Congeniality 2: Armed and Fabulous – Stan Fields (William Shatner)
Moby Dick (1984 TBS edition) – Starbuck (Leo Genn)
My Best Friend's Wedding – Walter Wallace (Philip Bosco)
The NeverEnding Story – Carl Conrad Coreander (Thomas Hill)
The NeverEnding Story (1987 TV Asahi edition) – Mr. Bux (Gerald McRaney)
Paper Moon – Floyd (Burton Gilliam)
Remo Williams: The Adventure Begins – General Scott Watson (George Coe)
Rise of the Planet of the Apes – Charles Rodman (John Lithgow)
The Rookie (1993 TBS edition) – Ulrich Sigmund Strom (Raul Julia)
The Rose – Rudge Campbell (Alan Bates)
seaQuest DSV – Captain Nathan Hale Bridger (Roy Scheider)
She-Wolf of London – Rev. Parfray (John Carlin)
The Shining – Stuart Ullman (Barry Nelson)
Sliver – Alex Parsons (Martin Landau)
Star Wars: Episode I – The Phantom Menace – Sio Bibble (Oliver Ford Davies)
Star Wars: Episode II – Attack of the Clones – Sio Bibble (Oliver Ford Davies)
The Terminator (1987 TV Asashi edition) – Dr. Silberman (Earl Boen)
Terminator 2: Judgment Day (1993 Fuji TV edition) – Dr. Silberman (Earl Boen)
They Live (1990 TV Asahi edition) – Street Preacher (Raymond St. Jacques)
Twilight – Raymond Hope (James Garner)
Valdez Is Coming – Frank Tanner (Jon Cypher)
Wall Street – Lynch (James Karen)
West Side Story (1979 TBS edition) – Glad Hand (John Astin)
Who's Afraid of Virginia Woolf? – George (Richard Burton)
X-Men – Erik Lehnsherr / Magneto (Ian McKellen)

Animation
Atlantis: The Lost Empire – Preston B. Whitmore
Atlantis: Milo's Return – Preston B. Whitmore
Batman: The Animated Series – Daniel Mockridge
The Fox and the Hound – Chief
G.I. Joe: A Real American Hero – Hawk
Home on the Range – Sheriff Sam Brown
One Hundred and One Dalmatians – Sgt. Tibs
Peter Pan – George Darling
Star Trek: The Animated Series – Spock
SWAT Kats: The Radical Squadron – Tiger Conklin
The Transformers – G1, Wheeljack, Skyfire, Beachcomber, Swindle, Kup, Metroplex, Alpha Trion, and others
The Transformers: The Movie – Kup and Ramjet

References

External links
 

1930 births
Japanese male video game actors
Japanese male voice actors
Aoni Production voice actors
Living people
Male voice actors from Osaka
20th-century Japanese male actors
21st-century Japanese male actors